Arabian Nights is a 3D action-adventure video game published in 2001 for Microsoft Windows in Europe. It was developed by Silmarils and published by Visiware and Wanadoo Edition. It is based on One Thousand and One Nights. It was released digitally on December 20, 2019 by Silmarils on GOG.com.

Plot
It is said that, following a wish granted by a Genie, the Sultan of Akabha had quintuplets, five magnificent daughters who answered to the lovely names of Muscade, Melissa, Hellebore, Spiruline and Guarana.

According to the laws of the Emirate of Akabha, a daughter of Sultan must take a husband before the day of her twentieth birthday. If she hasn't, she will be declared as Al Jotani (Arabic word for street girl), and will be taken from the palace and stripped of all her royal rights. On the death of the Sultan, power will pass to the eldest son, or if there is no eldest son, to the fiancé of the eldest daughter, failing that to Grand Vizir.

The story begins when the five princesses have disappeared and it is eve of their twentieth birthdays!
The player controls Ali, a bold and agile young man bestowed with magical powers and different weapons, who must save the princesses in record time! But he must also capture their hearts...

Arabian Nights is divided into seven episodes; each one has an introduction and a conclusion. The first episode contains a tutorial which shows how to control Ali and aims of the game.

References

External links

2001 video games
Action-adventure games
Silmarils (company) games
Video games based on Arabian mythology
Video games developed in France
Video games set in the Middle East
Windows games
Windows-only games
Works based on One Thousand and One Nights
The Adventure Company games
Single-player video games